HR 7484 (V1143 Cyg) is a binary star system in the northern constellation of Cygnus. It is dimly visible to the naked eye under good viewing conditions, having an apparent visual magnitude of 5.89. Based upon an annual parallax shift of 24.71, it is located 132 light years away. The system is moving closer with a heliocentric radial velocity of −14 km/s.

Observational history
Radial velocity measurements taken at the Dominion Astrophysical Observatory in Victoria, British Columbia Canada in 1919 led to the determination by William Edmund Harper that HR 7484 is a double-lined spectroscopic binary. The next year he published an orbit with a period of 7.6383 days as compared to the modern value of 7.64075217 days.

Physical characteristics
HR 7484 is a detached eclipsing binary, which means the orbital plane is aligned close to the line-of-sight from the Earth, causing the components to eclipse twice per orbit. The system is undergoing apsidal motion, with a rate greater than that predicted by general relativity. Both components are ordinary F-type main-sequence stars with similar physical properties. The star normally has an apparent magnitude of 5.89, but every 7.64 days (7 days, 15 hours, and 22 minutes) its brightness decreases to magnitude 6.37, approximately two thirds as bright.  Five days and 17 hours after each primary eclipse, there is a secondary eclipse when the brightness drops to magnitude 6.06, about 85% of the normal brightness. Each eclipse lasts for 220 minutes.  Both eclipses are partial.

References

F-type main-sequence stars
Algol variables
Cygnus (constellation)
Durchmusterung objects
185912
096620
7484
Cygni, V1143